James Rowland may refer to:

 James Rowland (RAAF officer) (1922–1999), Royal Australian Air Force commander
 J. Roy Rowland (born 1926), physician and politician from Georgia
 James Rowland (footballer) (born 2001), English footballer

See also
James Rowlands (disambiguation)
James Rowlandson (1577–1639), English clergyman